Port Austin Township is a civil township of Huron County in the U.S. state of Michigan.  The population was 1,591 at the 2000 census.

Communities
The Village of Port Austin is at the western end of the township on M-25 and at the northern terminus of M-53.
It was established in 1834.

Geography

Demographics
As of the census of 2000, there were 1,591 people, 760 households, and 471 families residing in the township. The racial makeup of the township was 98.49% White, 0.13% African American, 0.19% Native American, 0.19% Asian, 0.06% Pacific Islander, 0.19% from other races, and 0.75% from two or more races. Hispanic or Latino of any race were 1.38% of the population.

There were 760 households, out of which 17.9% had children under the age of 18 living with them, 52.6% were married couples living together, 7.1% had a female householder with no husband present, and 38.0% were non-families. 35.4% of all households were made up of individuals, and 18.7% had someone living alone who was 65 years of age or older.  The average household size was 2.07 and the average family size was 2.63.

In the township the population was spread out, with 16.7% under the age of 18, 4.7% from 18 to 24, 17.9% from 25 to 44, 33.1% from 45 to 64, and 27.7% who were 65 years of age or older.  The median age was 52 years. For every 100 females, there were 91.7 males.  For every 100 females age 18 and over, there were 90.2 males.

The median income for a household in the township was $32,841, and the median income for a family was $39,554. Males had a median income of $30,563 versus $25,000 for females. The per capita income for the township was $19,219.  About 11.1% of families and 12.9% of the population were below the poverty line, including 10.8% of those under age 18 and 12.1% of those age 65 or over.

References

Notes

Sources

Townships in Huron County, Michigan
Populated places on Lake Huron in the United States
Townships in Michigan